John Goode may refer to:

 John Goode (Virginia politician) (1829–1909), politician in the Confederate Congress, U.S. congressman and acting Solicitor General of the United States
 John Paul Goode (1862–1932), lawyer and politician in San Antonio
 John W. Goode (1923–1994), geographer and cartographer
 J. Thomas Goode (1835–1916), American politician in the Virginia House of Delegates

See also
 "Johnny B. Goode", a 1958 song by Chuck Berry
 John Good (disambiguation)